Róbert Rák (born 15 January 1978 in Rimavská Sobota) is a retired Slovak professional footballer who played as a striker for MFK Zemplín Michalovce and FC Nitra.  He was top goalscorer of the Corgoň Liga twice. First at the 2005–06 season, scoring 21 goals and second time at the 2009–10 season, scoring 18 goals.

Personal life
Rák comes from the Hungarian minority in Slovakia. His sister, named Viktória, is a popular actress in Slovakia, who played in the Hungarian language Thalia Theatre in Košice.

Match fixing 
Rák was involved in a match fixing scandal in Slovak football that came to light in September 2013. Allegedly, Rák together with six other football players, including the former Slovak international Ivan Hodúr, were supposed to have participated in fixing games of FK DAC 1904 Dunajská Streda. Rák was eventually given a 15-year suspension by the Disciplinary Committee of the Slovak FA, which was later extended worldwide by the FIFA Disciplinary Committee.

References

External links

1978 births
Living people
Sportspeople from Rimavská Sobota
Hungarians in Slovakia
Slovak footballers
Association football forwards
Slovak expatriate footballers
Expatriate footballers in Hungary
Expatriate footballers in Belarus
Expatriate footballers in Austria
Slovak expatriate sportspeople in Hungary
Slovak Super Liga players
Belarusian Premier League players
MŠK Rimavská Sobota players
FK Dukla Banská Bystrica players
Diósgyőri VTK players
MFK Ružomberok players
FC Nitra players
FC Dinamo Minsk players
MFK Zemplín Michalovce players
Match fixers